The 2011–12 Eredivisie is the 56th season of Eredivisie since its establishment in 1955. It began in August 2011 with the first matches of the season  and ended in June with the last matches of the European competition and relegation playoffs. AFC Ajax had the highest average attendance, around 49,000.

Teams
A total of 18 teams are taking part in the league, the best 15 teams from the 2010–11 season, two promotion/relegation playoff winners and the 2010–11 Eerste Divisie champions.

Managerial changes

League table

Results

Play-offs

European competition
The teams placed sixth through ninth compete in a play-off tournament for one spot in the second qualifying round of the 2012–13 UEFA Europa League. Teams on the left played the first leg at home.

Semi-finals
The first legs were played on 10 May 2012, while the return legs were competed on 13 May 2012.

Finals
The first leg was played on 17 May 2012, while the return leg was competed on 20 May 2012.

Relegation
VVV-Venlo and De Graafschap joined the Eerste Divisie-teams for the playoffs, after finishing 16th and 17th in the Eredivisie.
Teams on the left played the first leg at home.

Round 1
The first legs were played on 1 May 2012, while the return legs were competed on 5 May 2012.

Round 2
The first legs were played on 10 May 2012, with the return legs were competed on 13 May 2012.

Round 3

Top goalscorers
''Source: Eredivisie (official site) , Soccerway

Updated to games played on 6 May 2012 (end of competition)

References

Eredivisie seasons
1
Neth